Cecile D. Singer (born c. 1929) is an American politician from New York.

Life
She was born about 1929. The family lived in Forest Hills, Queens. She graduated from Queens College CUNY. She married David H. Singer (1924–2009), and they had two daughters. They lived for a time in Rockford, Illinois, and then in Chicago. In 1955, they moved to Yonkers, New York.

She entered politics as a Republican, and was an aide to Assemblyman Gordon W. Burrows, and executive director of several Assembly committees, for more than twenty years. In 1988, Burrows was nominated for the New York Supreme Court, and Cecile Singer was nominated to run for the open Assembly seat.

She was a member of the New York State Assembly from 1989 to 1994, sitting in the 188th, 189th and 190th New York State Legislatures.

She was a director of the Hudson Valley Bank from 1994 to January 1, 2013; and has been Principal of the Cecile D. Singer Consulting firm since 1995. She also remained active in community and women's affairs. She lives in Tuckahoe.

References

1929 births
Living people
People from Yonkers, New York
Republican Party members of the New York State Assembly
Queens College, City University of New York alumni
Women state legislators in New York (state)
21st-century American women